Polaroid may refer to:
 Polaroid Corporation, an American company known for its instant film and cameras
 Polaroid camera, a brand of instant camera formerly produced by Polaroid Corporation
 Polaroid film, instant film, and photographs
 Polaroid B.V., a Dutch manufacturer of instant film and cameras, owner of Polaroid Corporation's brand and intellectual property
 Polaroid (polarizer), a type of synthetic plastic sheet used to polarize light
 Polaroid Eyewear, with glare-reducing polarized lenses made from Polaroid's polarizer

Film and television
 Polaroid Song, a 2012 French short film directed by Alphonse Giorgi and Yann Tivrier
 Polaroid (film), a 2019 American horror film directed by Lars Klevberg

Music
 Polaroid (album), an album by Phantom Planet
 Gentlemen Take Polaroids, an album by the new wave band Japan
 Polaroids: A Greatest Hits Collection, a compilation album by Shawn Colvin
 "Polaroid" (Jonas Blue, Liam Payne and Lennon Stella song), 2018
 "Polaroid" (Keith Urban song), 2020
 "Polaroid", a 2015 song by Imagine Dragons from Smoke + Mirrors 
 "Polaroid de locura ordinaria", a 1988 song by Fito Páez
 "Polaroid* A Floridian pop-punk band

See also
 Poloroid or Danielle "Dan" Rowe, singer-songwriter 
 Polar (disambiguation)